Ema Burgić Bucko and Jasmina Tinjić were the defending champions, but Burgić Bucko had retired from professional tennis earlier in the year. Tinjić partnered Anna Morgina, but they lost in the first round to Richèl Hogenkamp and Karolína Muchová.

Amandine Hesse and Victoria Rodríguez won the title, defeating Michaela Hončová and Raluca Georgiana Șerban in the final, 3–6, 6–2, [10–6].

Seeds

Draw

References
Main Draw

ITS Cup - Doubles
ITS Cup